is a passenger railway station located in the city of Kuwana, Mie Prefecture, Japan, operated by the private railway operator Sangi Railway.

Lines
Hoshikawa Station is served by the Hokusei Line, and is located 5.5 kilometres from the terminus of the line at Nishi-Kuwana Station.

Layout
The station consists of a single side platform serving bi-directional traffic. The station is unattended.

Platforms

Adjacent stations

History
Hoshikawa Station was opened on April 5, 1914 as a station on the Hokusei Railway, but was closed on May 10, 1916. The station was reopened on September 8, 1927 for freight operations only, and passenger operations were resumed on November 1, 1932. The Hokusei Railway became the Hokusei Electric Railway on June 27, 1934. The station was again closed on July 1, 1944, and not reopened until February 1, 1964. Through a series of mergers, the line became part of the Kintetsu network by April 1, 1965. The station was closed for a third time on May 15, 1969. The Sangi Railway was spun out of Kintetsu as an independent company on April 1, 2003. Hoshikawa Station was reopened again on March 26, 2005 with a new station building, located some 500 meters towards Ageki from its original location.

Passenger statistics
In fiscal 2019, the station was used by an average of 797 passengers daily (boarding passengers only).

Surrounding area
Tsuda Gakuen Junior and Senior High School

See also
List of railway stations in Japan

References

External links

Sangi Railway official home page

Railway stations in Japan opened in 1914
Railway stations in Mie Prefecture
Kuwana, Mie